I Can't Wait is a 1994 EP released by Yngwie Malmsteen only in Japan. It contains three studio tracks and two live tracks from the 1994 Budokan concert.

The instrumental "Power and Glory" was made as a theme for Japanese pro wrestler and mixed martial artist Nobuhiko Takada.

Track listing

Personnel
Yngwie Malmsteen - guitars, backing vocals
Mike Vescera - vocals
Mats Olausson - keyboards, backing vocals
Mike Terrana - drums, backing vocals
Barry Sparks - bass guitar, backing vocals

1994 debut EPs
Yngwie Malmsteen EPs